A Verbindungsbahn (link line, connecting line, junction line) is in German language a railway line that links stations, in some cases of different railroad companies, sometimes bypassing specific stations. Its most simple form is a Umgehungsbahn (bypass railway). A Verbindungsbahn can often be found near Terminus stations (Kopfbahnhof in German), interlinking them in large cities with several terminus stations. Sometimes the Verbindungsbahn is also called Stammstrecke (lit. original line). The term can also be found in other European languages in a similar form. As an abbreviation for Verbindungsbahn sometimes V-Bahn is used.

Examples
Examples for a Verbindungsbahn are:

Germany

Verbindungsbahn (Frankfurt)
Verbindungsbahn (Hamburg)
Stammstrecke (München)
Verbindungsbahn (Stuttgart)

Austria

Switzerland
Verbindungsbahn (Basel)

References

Rail transport in Germany
Rail transport in Austria
Rail transport in Switzerland